Des Kunst (born 12 October 1999) is a Dutch football player who plays for Varbergs BoIS.

Club career
He made his Jong AZ debut in the Tweede Divisie, and then, after promotion he made his Eerste Divisie debut on 26 October 2018 in a game against Roda JC Kerkrade, as an 80th-minute substitute for Mees Hoedemakers.

References

External links
 

1999 births
Living people
People from Velsen
Dutch footballers
Association football midfielders
Jong AZ players
Eerste Divisie players
Tweede Divisie players
Varbergs BoIS players
Allsvenskan players
Dutch expatriate footballers
Expatriate footballers in Sweden
Dutch expatriate sportspeople in Sweden
Footballers from North Holland